Beneath the Blue Suburban Skies is a 2019 American film directed by Edward Burns. It premiered at the 2019 Toronto International Film Festival.

Cast
Jennifer Ehle as Tina
Edward Burns as Jim
Brian Wiles as Frankie
Hannah Dunne as Debbie
Wass Stevens
Donnamarie Recco
Brian d'Arcy James

Reception
Variety called it "an unassuming slice-of-life family drama in brittle black and white... Burns finds glimmers of hope and humor in the bleak with what feels like his most mature work to date."

References

External links
Beneath the Blue Suburban Skies at IMDb
Film page at TIFF
Beneath the Blue Suburban Skies at Letterbox DVD

2019 films
American drama films
2010s English-language films
2010s American films